Salmon Valley is a community on the British Columbia Railway north of Prince George, British Columbia.

References

Populated places in the Regional District of Fraser-Fort George